Gav Savar (also Romanized as Gāv Savār; also known as Goswār) is a village in Sardrud-e Olya Rural District, Sardrud District, Razan County, Hamadan Province, Iran. At the 2006 census, its population was 862, in 241 families.

References 

Populated places in Razan County